Please Don't Destroy is a comedy group in New York City consisting of Ben Marshall, John Higgins, and Martin Herlihy, who began collaborating as students at New York University. The group was originally founded in 2017 and based on an act titled Please Don't Destroy My Farm. The troupe performed monthly comedy shows, appeared at the New York Comedy Festival and produced sketch videos posted to YouTube. During the COVID-19 pandemic, they began creating shorter videos for TikTok and Twitter.

In 2021, the trio was hired as writers on Saturday Night Live (SNL) to produce prerecorded digital videos for the show's 47th season. Please Don't Destroy debuted on SNL on October 9, 2021. They recorded the song "Three Sad Virgins" with Pete Davidson and Taylor Swift.

Herlihy is the son of former SNL head writer and producer Tim Herlihy, while Higgins' father is long-time SNL writer, announcer and producer Steve Higgins.

List of prerecorded sketches

Season 47 (2021–22)

Season 48 (2022–23)

Filmography

References

2017 establishments in New York City
American comedy troupes
Comedy collectives